The 1984 U.S. National Indoor Championships was a men's tennis tournament played on indoor carpet courts that was part of the Super Series of the 1984 Volvo Grand Prix. It was played at the Racquet Club of Memphis in Memphis, Tennessee in the United States and held from February 6 through February 12, 1984. First-seeded Jimmy Connors won the singles title and earned $45,000 first-prize money.

Finals

Singles
 Jimmy Connors defeated  Henri Leconte 6–4, 4–6, 7–5
 It was Connors' 1st singles title of the year and the 101st of his career.

Doubles
 Peter Fleming /  Fritz Buehning defeated  Tomáš Šmíd /  Heinz Günthardt 6–3, 6–0

References

External links
 ITF tournament edition details

U.S. National Indoor
U.S. National Indoor Championships
Carpet court tennis tournaments
Indoor tennis tournaments
Tennis tournaments in the United States
U.S. National Indoor Tennis Championships
U.S. National Indoor Tennis Championships
U.S. National Indoor Tennis Championships